John Joseph Dullaghan III (November 27, 1930 – January 18, 2009) was an American film, stage and television actor. He was known for playing the role of Dr. Wilker in the American science fiction television series Battlestar Galactica.

Dullaghan was born in Brooklyn, New York. He guest-starred in television programs including Gunsmoke, The Rockford Files, Barnaby Jones, B. J. and the Bear (9 episodes), Night Court, The King of Queens and Cannon, and played the recurring role of Ray Brewer in Barney Miller.

His film appearances included Garden of the Dead, Kalifornia, The Thing with Two Heads, Apollo 13 and Sweet Sweetback's Baadasssss Song. On stage he appeared in repertory theatre as Pablo in the play Get To the Heart.

Dullaghan died in January 2009 of lung cancer in Los Angeles, California, at the age of 78. His body was cremated.

References

External links 

Rotten Tomatoes profile

1930 births
2009 deaths
People from Brooklyn
Deaths from lung cancer in California
Male actors from New York (state)
American male film actors
American male television actors
American male stage actors
20th-century American male actors